Clap note is an unofficial shorthand term describing an interest-only financing tool used by certain institutional investors, such as major corporations for the purpose of funding new real-estate acquisitions.

Terminology
The instrument is called a ‘clap note’ because it provides the same interest rate ‘out of two different hands’ (“it takes two hands to clap”). For example, a so-called “10/10 Clap Note” is one that is sold at a 10% discount on the face value while simultaneously paying 10% annual interest. The investor in a $100,000 10/10 clap note can buy the note at a discount of 10%, or $90,000 yet be paid 10% interest per year on the full face value of the note (i.e. $10,000). Then, since the note is an interest-only instrument, when the term expires, the investor receives the full face value, which includes another 10% profit.

Therefore, the “fist hand” of the clap note is the annual interest rate of 10% and the “second hand” is the 10% profit paid at the end of the term of the note, which is normally 24 months.

Because clap notes are not available to the general public and are generally only sold to ‘insiders,’ there appears to be no standard name for these instruments. Frequently the official name or heading on the note includes the name of the corporation on whose behalf the note is issued, e.g., “XYZ Corporation Interest Only Real Estate Discount Note Issue #1234” or something similar.

Functionality
In the United States, clap notes usually have terms exceeding 12 months but invariably not longer than 24 months. This allows the investor to take advantage of long-term capital gains tax treatment while ensuring that the principal is still returned in a timely manner. In any case, the company that issues the note usually does not intend to use it as a long-term financing strategy.

The combination of a relatively short term with comparatively high interest, in contrast to other options available to investors, like certificates of deposit (CDs), makes clap notes very attractive to investors who can afford them. Using the example above, assuming that the $100,000 10/10 clap note has a term of two years, the investor sees a return on his $90,000 principal of $10,000 per year (i.e. $20,000) plus another $10,000 when the term ends. On the $90,000 principal that would be a return on investment (ROI) of $30,000 (i.e. 33.33%) over a two-year period or 16.66% per annum (APR). At the time of this writing, that return represents more than four times the rate available on a comparable CD at a reputable U.S. bank.

The other attraction to investors is the penalty-free monthly cash flow that the clap note provides from the “first hand.”  Using the example above, the investor can expect a monthly payment amounting to 10% ÷ 12 (i.e., 0.833%) of the $100,000 face value, or $833.33. Considering that the investment was only $90,000, the monthly cash flow equates to an annualized return of 11.11%, which carries no penalties if he decides to sell the note prior its 24-month maturity date. CDs always attract penalties if the investor pulls out early.

Exclusivity
Small investors are usually excluded from these investment opportunities, because clap notes tend to have face values in the range of hundreds of thousands of dollars. Also, they are normally only offered to insiders—persons who have invested with the particular entity in the past.

The very structure of the note encourages the investor to reinvest the full face value for additional tax savings if another note is available for investment. In the U.S., this tax saving strategy is accomplished by what is known as a 1031 Exchange. The IRS allows the investor to defer payment of any taxes on the profit made on the “second hand” (in the case of the above example, that would be $10,000) indefinitely into the future if the investor “exchanges” the investment for a similar one, which, in practice, means that the investor could buy another clap note with a face value of $111,111, thus instantly saving about $3,300 in taxes and simultaneously making another $11,111 in profit on his original investment of $90,000.

Another strategy used by corporations issuing clap notes to exclude small-time speculators is a waiting period before the first payment is made. Strictly speaking, clap notes are private mortgages on real estate. As such, the payments made to the investors from the “first hand” are remitted monthly. However, since the interest rates on clap notes are so attractive, individuals might be tempted to get low-interest loans from banks and other sources under false pretenses and invest the money in a clap note. A four- to six-month waiting period at the beginning of the note term is intended to discourage such behavior.

Origin
It is unclear when clap notes first appeared in the U.S. However, some who have been involved with clap notes for several decades believe that clap notes first appeared in the late-1970s. To put this in perspective it is necessary to recall that in the late 1960s to early 1970s the main influences on the U.S. economy were the Vietnam War and the Watergate Scandal. The super-inflation of the period resulted in returns of as much as 17% on CDs, while the stock market was taking a plunge. When the oil crisis started in 1973, real estate prices plummeted. Institutional property investors, recognizing the opportunity, borrowed money at high interest rates from banks to buy these property bargains. When interest rates dropped again a short time later, they refinanced their acquisitions at lower rates.

The drop in interest rates caused CD investors to pull their money back out of CDs and start looking for new high-yield instruments. It is not really clear how these former CD investors and the institutional property buyers found each other, but it seems that some petroleum-industry corporations based in Houston, Texas, ailing from the oil crisis, yet wanting to take advantage of low real estate prices for the expansion of gas station networks, could no longer qualify as easily for bank financing as they could in the early part of the decade. Wealthy CD investors in the same area, no longer able to achieve high yields from banks, may have found a solution to both their needs and those of their oil-industry counterparts by inventing the clap note.

Current use
Today, the clap note still remains an exclusive investment vehicle for well-heeled investors. However, the actual origination of the instruments has shifted from the lender to the borrower, with servicing companies managing the payments to the investors on behalf of the borrowers. Companies that require ongoing expansion of their outlet networks still use this method to raise capital at times when real estate values drop. This includes gas station networks, fast food chains, drug store and pharmacy chains as well as muffler, transmission and brake repair workshops. The fact that clap notes are always backed by real estate makes them far more secure than most other investments that yield similar rates of return.

In many instances, the property being acquired is raw land or real estate that is scheduled to be condemned, and is therefore available at very low cost. Companies also time their real estate acquisitions when property values are generally on the decline. Although the property buyers are invariably AAA corporations, the nature of the property and the timing of the purchase vis-à-vis the prevailing interest rate cycle, makes these transactions unattractive to banks.

Clap note investors benefit from this situation, because the corporation has established a long-term plan for the property in which the 24 months of high interest is only a small component. Invariably the company has an exit strategy in mind for the property that includes refinancing in two years via buyer-assumable, low-interest Wall Street conduit loans. This allows them to pay off the clap note investors at full face value. During the two-year period, the company also completes all construction improvements on the property (gas station, fast food outlet, drug store or whatever).

With the clap notes now out of the way, the construction improvements done and having a low-interest conduit loan on the property that can be easily assumed by another buyer, the company can now move on to step three of their real estate strategy, which is usually a sale leaseback, in which they sell the property to another real estate investor with themselves as the long-term lessee. Having a AAA lessee on the property in a long-term lease increases the value of the property dramatically beyond the value of the built improvements. Selling the property in a sale leaseback at this stage allows the corporation to have its cake and eat it too: they no longer own the property, but they have the site! Invariably, the new buyer can assume the low-interest conduit loan (a win for the buyer) while the equity payout that the company receives from the sale more than covers the cost of the construction and allows the new outlet to start business debt free with an operating capital buffer (a win for the company).

Future
As more and more franchises appear on the scene, all in a desperate push to increase the number of outlets in their networks, it is likely that the demand for clap notes will increase, gradually making them available to new classes of smaller investors through investment clubs and other avenues.

Commercial bonds
Banking
Banking terms